Pou Vannary was a Cambodian singer active in the early 1970s. She was one of many Cambodian musicians believed to have perished during the Khmer Rouge regime starting in 1975.

History
Little is known of Pou Vannary's life and history, and her music career was very short. She was a late entrant in the thriving Cambodian rock and pop music scene of the 1960s and 70s, which initially had been fostered by Head of State Norodom Sihanouk. That scene was first influenced by French and Latin American pop records that had been imported into Cambodia, and later by Western rock and roll and soul music via U.S. armed forces radio that had been broadcast to troops stationed nearby during the Vietnam War. 

Vannary was profiled in the 2015 documentary film on the history of Cambodian pop music, Don't Think I've Forgotten. According to research conducted for the film, Vannary was somewhat unusual among other female Cambodian pop singers of her time, due to her relaxed vocal style and ability to accompany herself on acoustic guitar in the mode of an American singer-songwriter. She could also speak English and specialized in translated versions of American/British pop songs. Her most widely-known recording today is a cover of James Taylor’s "You've Got a Friend" with Khmer lyrics.

Like many of her contemporaries in Cambodian popular music, Vannary's career ended abruptly when the Khmer Rouge gained control of the country in April 1975 and forced city dwellers to become farm workers to fulfill their visions of agrarian socialism and the eradication of all foreign and western influences (including music) from Cambodian society. Vannary disappeared during the ensuing Cambodian genocide and her exact fate is unknown. Few of her recordings have survived due to the chaos of the Khmer Rouge regime. Her rendition of "You’ve Got a Friend" appeared on the soundtrack to Don't Think I've Forgotten in 2015, and a few more of her songs have appeared on compilations like the 2011 CD Cambodia Rock Spectacular! from Lion Productions.

References

20th-century Cambodian women singers
People who died in the Cambodian genocide
Year of birth missing
Year of death missing